The men's javelin throw event at the 2014 African Championships in Athletics was held on August 14 on Stade de Marrakech.

Results

References

2014 African Championships in Athletics
Javelin throw at the African Championships in Athletics